General Franklin may refer to:

Charles D. Franklin (1931–1992), U.S. Army lieutenant general
Craig A. Franklin (fl. 1980s–2010s), U.S. Air Force lieutenant general 
Ray Franklin (1934–2017), U.S. Marine Corps major general
William B. Franklin (1823–1903), Union Army major general

See also
Harold Franklyn (1885−1963), British Army general
William Franklyn (British Army officer) (1856–1914), British Army lieutenant general
Attorney General Franklin (disambiguation)